War of the Worlds 2: The Next Wave is a 2008 direct-to-DVD science fiction action adventure comedy horror thriller film directed by and starring C. Thomas Howell. The film was produced and distributed independently by The Asylum.

The film is a sequel to the film H. G. Wells' War of the Worlds, an adaptation of the 1898 H. G. Wells novel and mockbuster of the DreamWorks/Paramount adaptation of the same source. The film's tone and overall plot significantly differ from the first film and recycles elements from the novel.

The film is set two years after the initial alien invasion, following the remnants of the human race who launch an attack on the planet Mars to counter a second attack. C. Thomas Howell reprises his role as George Herbert.

Plot 

George Herbert explains that despite years of searching for extraterrestrial life, mankind never expected the invasion which devastated human civilization into anarchy, and that the aliens were killed by a lack of immunity to the bacteria in the human blood they consumed. Two years later, a town is seen, populated with silent refugees including characters Shackleford and Sissy. Suddenly, three Tripods land in the city. People are struck by a Heat-Ray. Shackleford takes a sample of Sissy's blood, with which he injects himself.

In Washington, American society has not recovered from the invasion. George Herbert recognises a familiar disturbance on the radio, as the same heard during the first invasion and he reveals to Major Kramer and a team of scientists that his studies show that the aliens are creating a wormhole between Earth and Mars for another wave of attacks. A fleet of fighter jets, which appear to have deep-space flight capabilities, thereby raid the planet Mars. George returns home for his son Alex, only to find a Tripod outside his home, which abducts Alex. He escapes to an abandoned city and wakes the next morning to find a man named Pete running from a Tripod. George throws himself before the machine, and wakes inside the machine with Pete. Both escape with Sissy, while the Martians begin a second invasion, attacking London and Paris. Major Kramer leads the fleet of jets to chase the alien mothership back to Mars.

George, Pete, and Sissy find themselves in the town from the start of the film; where Shackleford reveals that the town is created by the Tripods for humans captured by Tripods to live on Mars. Shackleford wants to destroy the aliens in the same way bacteria did them in during the first invasion. Shackleford and Sissy are dying of a virus lethal to the Tripods, and he convinces George to inject his infected blood into himself. George and Pete are kidnapped again and arrive inside the mothership, where they find Alex in a cocoon. There, George injects his infected blood into a pod holding a brain telepathically connected to all of the Tripods, and thus deactivates the invasion. George, Pete, and Alex escape just as the mothership explodes. George survives the infection, and the humans celebrate while listening to the radio, which undergoes some static interference, indicating a third invasion, and the characters spend a few moments in silence before the film ends.

Cast
 C. Thomas Howell as George Herbert (a play on H.G. Wells' first two names, Herbert George)
 Christopher Reid as Peter Silverman
 Dashiell Howell as Alex Herbert
 Fred Griffith as Major Kramer

Reception

Blu-Ray.com gave the film 1.5 stars out of 5, finding that while it opens well, it quickly falls apart, becoming a jumbled mess.

Differences from the novel
War of the Worlds 2 is notably different in tone to its predecessor. While War of the Worlds kept relatively faithful to the novel with a focus on realism and humanity rather than the aliens themselves, War of the Worlds 2 features considerably more outlandish science-fiction elements, discarding the horror treatment of the first film for an action/adventure premise. The film's plot is mostly original, its characters entirely so, though it does feature elements from The War of the Worlds which were excluded from the first film.

 Unlike the novel, humans are shown as having considerable effect and competence in the fight against the aliens. The character of the Artilleryman entertains the possibility of taking down and studying a fighting-machine and building new ones with human pilots to repel the invaders. Humans are seen using jets which have been upgraded with the aliens' technology to fight against the invaders.
 The first film made effort to disguise the Martian heritage of the aliens (though director David Michael Latt confirmed that the aliens were indeed Martians). In War of the Worlds 2, it has become common-knowledge between events that the aliens originated from Mars - though instead of being launched straight from the planet like in the novel, their ships appear to be transported to near-earth space by a wormhole.
 In the novel, the Martians are seen abducting humans, carrying them and placing them in metal cages carried by the machines themselves. In War of the Worlds 2, the Tripods use a teleportation-gun to place their prisoners inside them.

Soundtrack
The film's music was composed by Ralph Reickermann, a former composer for The Asylum. The film features the single "You Came into my Life" which featured the vocals of singer John Brown Reese.

References

External links 
 War of the Worlds 2: The Next Wave official site
 
 

2008 films
2008 direct-to-video films
2008 independent films
2008 science fiction films
Alien invasions in films
American science fiction films
Mockbuster films
The Asylum films
Direct-to-video sequel films
American post-apocalyptic films
Films based on The War of the Worlds
Films directed by C. Thomas Howell
2000s English-language films
2000s American films
Films with screenplays by Eric Forsberg